Grigoris Rallatos (Greek: Γρηγόρης Ραλλάτος) born in , is a Greek professional basketball player who last played for Holargos in the Greek Basket League.

Rallatos started his career in the youth academies of Panionios B.C. with whom he finished first in the Greek league, in the U-16 and in the U18. Then he signed for Panelefsiniakos B.C., Panerythraikos and Ikaros Kallitheas B.C. He has achieved two promotions for the Greek A2 Basket League as well.

Youth career

Rallatos made his first basketball steps in the academy of Panionios B.C. in which he stayed between 1996 and 2004. He was an exciting prospect according to the team's coaching staff as well. He won 1 Greek U-16 cup in 2002 and 1 Greek U-18 cup in 2004 with the side of Nea Smirni

Club career
In 2004 he signed for Panelefsiniakos B.C. which was then playing in the Greek 3rd tier, B' Ethniki but left one year later, in 2005.

In 2005 he signed for the amateur side, Kentavros Dafnis from which he left in 2006.

In 2006, he moved to Panerythraikos in the B' Ethniki and after a fantastic season, he and his teammates managed to gain promotion for the 2nd, and fully professional tier, A2.

In 2007, he signed for Ikaros Kallitheas B.C. and stayed once again for just 1 year.

In 2008, he signed a new contract with Niki Amarousiou. He left in 2009.

In 2009 he joined Polis Kallitheas. In the first season with his new team,  managed to achieve a high finish, but failed to promote.
In his second season (2010–11) with the Kallithea side, he managed to achieve a promotion once more, this time for the 4th tier, G' Ethniki.
In 2011, he once more signed for a 5th tier club, Ermis Peraus in which he stayed for 1 year.

In 2012 he was asked to play in the NFL, due to his height, and incredible strength. He then moved to the US starting his NFL career, by signing in the Philadelphia Eagles side. He stayed there for 2,5 years, before returning to Greece.

In 2014, he returned to Greece and signed for Aris Nikaias and secured promotion from the 5th tier to the 4th. In 2015, he signed for Marousi and once more his team promoted from the 4th tier, to the 3rd.
In 2016 he signed his first professional basketball contract with Pagrati in which he stayed for 1 year.

In 2017, he made the breakthrough by signing Panionios B.C. in the Greek Basket League for the first time in his career. In 2018 he signed for Holargos B.C., in the club's 1st season in the highest national league. He was a crucial member of the outstanding season Holargos had, reaching the play-offs and defeating AEK in the second game after an away loss, before eventually losing and the third game and being eliminated from the play-offs' quarter finals.
He was an important member due to the motivation his teammates was getting from him, being a passionate person on and off the court.

International career

2002-2004

During this period, Rallatos was always a strong reserve standing out of hundreds of athletes, but was never selected to be in the 12 men roster.

2014

In 2014 he represented Greece in the 3v3 world championship qualifiers in Latvia and in the European championship held in Romania- he was a runner-up.

2015

In 2015 Rallatos represented Greece in the first European Olympic games and finished 6th

Further reading

NFL

Rallatos became the first Greek player to join the NFL in the US by signing for the Philadelphia side, Philadelphia Eagles and staying there for 2½ years between 2012 and 2014.

Style of play

Rallatos can play as a power forward. Due to his outstanding strength, he can mark, post and keep the ball very well. He is a great 6.75m shooter, and has a great rebound per match ratio.

About

Rallatos is probably the only Greek basketball player to have played in all the 5 tiers of professional and amateur leagues. He is also the only Greek to have played in the NFL

Professional sports industries

Rallatos is the owner of 2 companies-Cosmos Grass enterprises and Terrain that offer professional sports' facilities services in Greece. These companies are one of the best in the country with almost 30 years of quality and safety in field construction. In addition to the work it undertakes and performs, it has a program that assists municipalities and communities in the maintenance and reconstruction of damaged stadiums in Greece by providing the knowledge and experience of companies to avoid injuries and accidents on old or observed stadiums. The lack of well maintenanced sports facilities that are becoming more and more dangerous in Greece and especially in the less populated towns outside Athens, is something that he is trying to change by providing new quality equipment.

References

External links

Sports Industries
 Cosmos Grass enterprises official website
 Terrain official website

Other
 Ραλλατος: Η "Πανιώνια" μοίρα που κέρδισε το NFL!
Ραλλατος: Το χρονικό ενός πεισματάρη ονειροπόλου

Greek men's basketball players
Basketball players from Athens
Power forwards (basketball)
1986 births
Living people
Basketball players at the 2015 European Games
European Games competitors for Greece
21st-century Greek people